The 1989–90 season of the Moroccan Throne Cup was the 34th edition of the competition.

Olympique de Casablanca won the cup, beating FAR de Rabat 4–2 on penalties after a 0–0 draw in the final, played at the Prince Moulay Abdellah Stadium in Rabat. Olympique de Casablanca won the competition for the first time in their history.

Competition

Last 16

Quarter-finals

Semi-finals

Final 
The final took place between the two winning semi-finalists, Olympique de Casablanca and FAR de Rabat, on 18 September 1990 at the Prince Moulay Abdellah Stadium in Rabat.

Notes and references 

1989
1989 in association football
1990 in association football
1989–90 in Moroccan football